These are the broadcasters for the Formula E, the world electric racing championship.

References

Formula E
Media